Mosk may refer to:
Stanley Mosk (1912–2001), judge in California 
Richard M. Mosk (1939–2016), judge in California 
Mosque, a place of worship for followers of Islam